is the seventh single by Japanese girl group NMB48.

Release 
The single was released in four versions: Type A, B, C and Theater Edition. Each of the limited editions came with a bonus DVD will different contents except for similar title track music video. First Press versions of each came with a lottery ticket for handshake event, trading card (1 of 16 for each type – 48 total), and raw photo (1 of 63). The coupling song "Todokana Soude Todoku Mono" was used as the theme song to NMB's comedy show "Geinin! 2".

Track listing

Type-A

Type-B

Type-C

Theater Edition

Members

"Bokura no Eureka" 
(Center: Sayaka Yamamoto)
 Team N: Miori Ichikawa, Mayu Ogasawara, Riho Kotani, Kei Jonishi, Miru Shiroma, Sayaka Yamamoto, Akari Yoshida, Miyuki Watanabe
 Team M: Rena Shimada, Yui Takano, Airi Tanigawa, Fuuko Yagura, Nana Yamada, Keira Yogi 
 Team BII: Yuuka Katou, Shu Yabushita

"Todokekana Soude Todoku Mono" 
 Team N: Mayu Ogasawara, Haruna Kinoshita, Riho Kotani, Rina Kondo, Kei Jonishi, Miru Shiroma, Sayaka Yamamoto, Akari Yoshida, Miyuki Watanabe
 Team M: Momoka Kinoshita, Nana Yamada
 Team BII: Yuri Ota, Rina Kushiro, Shu Yabushita
 Team A (AKB48): Yui Yokoyama

"Okuba" 
Shirogumi
 Team N: Mayu Ogasawara, Rika Kishino, Haruna Kinoshita, Yuuki Yamaguchi, Kanako Kadowaki, Sayaka Yamamoto
 Team M: Yuki Azuma, Natsumi Yamagishi, Nana Yamada, Ayaka Murakami
 Team BII: Konomi Kusaka, Emika Kamieda

"Yabanna Softcream" 
Akagumi
 Team N: Miori Ichikawa, Narumi Koga, Rina Kondo, Miyuki Watanabe
 Team M: Mao Mita, Ayaka Okita, Rena Kawakami, Fuuko Yagura, Momoka Kinoshita
 Team BII: Hazuki Kurokawa, Kanako Muro, Rikako Kobayashi

"Hinadande wa Boku no Miryoku wa Ikinainda" 
Namba Teppoutai Sono San
 Team N: Miru Shiroma, Aika Nishimura
 Team M: Sae Murase, Keira Yogi
 Team BII: Hono Akazawa, Yuuri Ota
 Kenkyuusei: Nagisa Shibuya, Rina Yamao

"Sayanee"
This song is about team captain Sayaka Yamamoto.
 Team M: Arisa Koyanagi
 Team BII: Akari Ishizuka, Anna Ijiri, Mirei Ueda, Mako Umehara, Kono Saki, Tsubasa Yamauchi
 Kenkyuusei: Natsuko Akashi, Yumi Ishida, Masako Ishihara, Mizuki Uno, Mai Odan, Noa Ogawa, Chihiro Kawakami, Momoka Shimazaki, Riko Takayama, Honoka Terui, Hiromi Nakagawa, Reina Nakano, Rurina Nishizawa, Momoka Hayashi, Chiho Matsuoka, Megumi Matsumura, Arisa Miura, Ayaka Morita, Rina Yamao

References

External links 
 NMB48 Official website - Discography of 7th single

2013 singles
Japanese-language songs
Songs with lyrics by Yasushi Akimoto
NMB48 songs
2013 songs